Soul Snatcher is a 2020 Chinese costume fantasy film produced by Jiang Zhiqiang starring Li Xian and Chen Linong.

Plot

To achieve immortality and be promoted to spiritual immortal, magical fox spirit Bai Shisan (Li Xian) disguises himself as a young man and travels to the human world in search of a 'divine pill', or a central spiritual reservoir that entities possess, to take - killing the original holder. There he befriends the innocent and impoverished scholar Wang Zijin (Chen Linong), who is on a journey to  Beijing to take the arduous imperial magistrates examination. To keep Wang safe, Bai Shisan must bond with him on the road to the examination and fend off threats from mythic creatures and evil spirits who run rampant along their journey. Along the way Bai Shisan comes to realize Wang's divine pill is the key to Bai Shisan's transcendence. What choice will Bai Shishan make once he realizes that in order to achieve immortality he would have to kill his best friend?

Cast

Starring
 Chen Linong as Wang Zijin
 Li Xian as Bai Shisan (Thirteen)

Co-Starring
 Hankiz Omar as Yinglian
 Jiang Chao as Kuhai Academy owner Zhu
 Pei Kuishan as Mr. He
 Chang Chen-kuang as chief of fox tribe
 Li Xiaochuan as Yin-Yang Taoist priest

Guest Starring
Wang Yaoching as Liu Daoran

Special Appearance
Hao Shaowen as donkey shack owner
Tien Niu as chicken restaurant owner
Yang Zi as Ying Wuxie

Production
Two months before the start-up, Chen Linong, and Li Xian entered the group ahead of schedule, performing an average of 6 hours of performance and movement training every day as seen on the soundtrack's MV, Glorious Future sung by the two male lead. The crew also organized script readings many times to further improve the script and character details. In January, the director decided to change the title from Spring River Flower Moon Night (Chun Jiang Hua Yue Ye) into Red Fox Scholar and announced that they would set a schedule for the 2020 summer. However, because the special effects of the movie have not been completed, and the trailer cannot be cut out for the time being, the two portraits of Chen Linong and Li Xian acted as stage dramas, and they creatively performed a version of the "concept trailer". In addition to the trailer, "Red Fox Scholar" also released a concept poster designed by artist Huang Hai. Chen Linong and Li Xian lay on the river facing the wind, and a little star reflected from the sky reflected on the river, forming a huge fox. Due to the many private questions on Weibo, the author makes an explanation that the two male led isn't involved on love story but just friend and the genre is a fantasy drama.

Marketing
Prior to the production announcement, Chen Linong and Li Xian appeared on Elle Cover. The two male lead released soundtrack of Red Fox Scholar, titled Glorious Future (Qian Cheng Si jin) peak at 8 on Billboard China Social Chart

Release
In China, Soul Snatcher was originally planned to open in August 2020. However, due to the COVID-19 pandemic, the film's release was first postponed to November, and eventually released on December 4.

Reception

Soul Snatcher earned $19,500,000 at the Chinese box office.

References

External links
 
 

2020 films
2020s Mandarin-language films
Chinese drama films
Films postponed due to the COVID-19 pandemic
2020 drama films
2020 fantasy films